Richard Emeka Friday (born 16 February 2000) is a Nigerian footballer who plays for GAIS in the Superettan in Sweden.

Club career
On 12 March 2022, Friday signed with GAIS.

References

External links

2000 births
Living people
People from Abuja
Nigerian footballers
Nigerian expatriate footballers
Association football wingers
FK Liepāja players
FK Spartaks Jūrmala players
Örebro SK players
GAIS players
Latvian Higher League players
Allsvenskan players
Ettan Fotboll players
Nigerian expatriate sportspeople in Latvia
Nigerian expatriate sportspeople in Sweden
Expatriate footballers in Latvia
Expatriate footballers in Sweden